Richmond Centre can refer to:
Electoral district
Richmond Centre (provincial electoral district), a riding of the Legislative Assembly of British Columbia
Richmond Centre (electoral district), a riding of the House of Commons of Canada

Shopping Centres
Richmond Centre (mall), a shopping mall in Richmond, British Columbia, Canada
Richmond Centre (Derry), a shopping centre in Derry, Northern Ireland